Senator Aspinall may refer to:

Joseph Aspinall (1854–1939), New York State Senate
Wayne N. Aspinall (1896–1983), Colorado State Senate

See also
Homer F. Aspinwall (1846–1919), Illinois State Senate